Møkeren is a lake in the municipality of Kongsvinger in Innlandet county, Norway. The  lake lies in the Finnskogen area which is a hilly, forested area that runs along the border with Sweden. The European route E16 highway runs along the west side of the lake.

See also
List of lakes in Norway

References

Kongsvinger
Lakes of Innlandet